Daniel Rose (July 31, 1772 – October 25, 1833) was an American politician from the State of Maine.  He was a member of the Democratic-Republican Party, and served as president of the Maine Senate. He briefly served as the fourth Governor from January 2 to January 5, 1822, filling an unexpired term between the administrations of Benjamin Ames and Albion K. Parris.

Rose was born in the Connecticut Colony and graduated from Yale University in 1791. He settled in Alna, Maine and studied and practiced medicine in nearby Boothbay. Rose served as a member of the Maine Senate from its founding in 1820 until 1824. He was the President of the Maine Senate from in 1822 and 1823. Upon finishing his terms in the Maine Senate, Rose was moved to Thomaston, Maine and became the Warden of the Maine State Prison, which he helped design.

References

Daniel Rose bio from the National Governors Association

1772 births
1833 deaths
Connecticut Democrats
Yale University alumni
People from Alna, Maine
Physicians from Maine
American military personnel of the War of 1812
Presidents of the Maine Senate
Governors of Maine
American law enforcement officials
Maine Democratic-Republicans
People from Thomaston, Maine
Democratic-Republican Party state governors of the United States
People of colonial Connecticut
People from Boothbay, Maine